Rey Castle was an ancient castle or defensive wall, located in Cheshmeh-Ali, south of Tehran and north of Rey. The castle is located above the Fath Ali shah inscription and dates back to 4000 BC in the Medes empire. It is assumed that the Castle was ruined by an earthquake and that Seleucus I Nicator rebuilt it.

See Also 

 Rashkan Castle
 Fath Ali Shah Inscription

Resources 
 باروی ری darioush-shahbazi.com Persian Language.

Castles in Iran
Medes castles
Cheshmeh-Ali complex
Buildings and structures in Tehran Province

National works of Iran
Medes
Ruined castles in Iran